| tries = {{#expr:
1 + 5 + 1 +  3 + 3 + 3 + 9 + 5 +  2 + 2 + 
3 + 1 + 5 +  3 + 5 + 3 + 4 + 3 +  1 + 4 + 
7 + 3 + 3 +  3 + 5 + 0 + 5 + 1 +  3 + 4 + 
2 + 0 + 5 +  2 + 1 + 4 + 2 + 3 +  2 + 5 + 
3 + 2 + 4 +  1 + 6 + 1 + 3 + 2 +  3 + 2 + 
3 + 4 + 2 +  3 + 3 + 4 + 3 + 6 +  8 + 5 + 
1 + 4 + 3 +  1 + 4 + 3 + 3 + 5 +  5 + 3 + 
1 + 5 + 4 +  6 + 3 + 3 + 6 + 4 + 11 + 4 + 
3 + 3 + 1 + 10 + 8 + 6 + 7 + 7 +  1 + 8 + 
3 + 1 + 2 
}}
| top point scorer = Dan Parks (Glasgow)(216 points)
| top try scorer = Tim Visser (Edinburgh)(10 tries)
| website = www.rabodirectpro12.com
| prevseason = 2008–09
| nextseason = 2010–11
}}
The 2009–10 Celtic League (known as the 2009–10 Magners League for sponsorship reasons) was the ninth season of the league now known as Pro12 and the fourth with Magners as title sponsor. The season began in September 2009 and ended with the Grand Final on 29 May 2010. Ten teams played each other on a home-and-away basis, with teams earning four points for a win, two points for a draw and a bonus point for scoring four or more tries in a match. The losing team may also earn a bonus point if they lose by seven points or less.

The ten teams competing consisted of the four Irish provinces, Munster, Leinster, Connacht and Ulster; two Scottish regions, Edinburgh Rugby and Glasgow Warriors; and four Welsh regions, Cardiff Blues, Newport Gwent Dragons, Ospreys and Scarlets.

This season saw the introduction of a play-off structure similar to the English Premiership in order to determine the overall winner. The Ospreys won the final, defeating Leinster 17–12 in Dublin.

Teams

Table

Regular season results

Round 1

Round 2

Round 3

Round 4

Round 5

Round 6

Round 7

Round 8

Round 9

1872 Cup 1st round

Round 10

1872 Cup 2nd round

Round 11

Round 12

Round 13

Rearranged fixtures

Round 14

Round 15

Rearranged fixture

Round 16

Rearranged fixture

Round 17

Round 18

Playoffs

Semi-finals

Grand Final

Leading scorers
Note: Flags to the left of player names indicate national team as has been defined under IRB eligibility rules, or primary nationality for players who have not yet earned international senior caps. Players may hold one or more non-IRB nationalities.

Top points scorers

Top try scorers

Notes

References

External links
 Magners Celtic League 2009/10 at BBC

 
  
2009-10
2009–10 in Irish rugby union
2009–10 in Scottish rugby union
2009–10 in Welsh rugby union